Malcolm George Richardson Chisholm (born 7 March 1949) is a Scottish politician who served as Minister for Health and Community Care from 2001 to 2004 and Minister for Communities from 2004 to 2006. A member of the Scottish Labour Party, he was Member of Parliament (MP) for Edinburgh North and Leith, formerly Edinburgh Leith, from 1992 to 2001 and Member of the Scottish Parliament (MSP) for the equivalent seat and its successor from 1999 to 2016.

Career

Chisholm was Member of Parliament for Edinburgh Leith from 1992, then Edinburgh North and Leith from 1997. He served as a Parliamentary Under-Secretary of State for Scotland responsible for local government and transport minister for a few months in 1997; but resigned over single parent benefit cuts. He remained an MP until 2001, when he stood down from the House of Commons in order to concentrate on the Scottish Parliament, to which he was elected in 1999 for the same constituency.

Chisholm became Minister for Health and Community Care in 2001, then Minister for Communities from October 2004. As Minister for Health and Community Care, he introduced and oversaw the passage of the National Health Service Reform (Scotland) Bill which brought about the abolition of NHS Trusts in Scotland and the creation of Community Health Partnerships.

As Minister for Communities, Chisholm oversaw investment in the building of affordable homes, approved a proposal from Fife Council for a moratorium on council house sales in order to maintain the supply of affordable housing, developed reforms of planning policy to protect green spaces, and extended the Central Heating Programme and Warm Deal to provide and refurbish heating systems for pensioners.

In December 2006, Chisholm criticised the decision to renew Britain's Trident nuclear deterrent, in opposition to First Minister Jack McConnell, leading to speculation that Chisholm might be removed from office. He subsequently resigned on 21 December 2006 after supporting a motion passed by the Scottish National Party that opposed the replacement of the nuclear submarines.

On 17 September 2007, Chisholm was appointed Shadow Minister for Culture and External Affairs by new Scottish Labour leader, Wendy Alexander. In September 2008, Chisholm returned to the backbenches.

In April 2014, Chrisholm announced his intent to stand down at the 2016 election, with Lesley Hinds replacing him as Labour candidate in the Edinburgh Northern and Leith seat.

References

External links
 
Malcolm Chisholm MSP Profile at Labour party website
Malcolm Chisholm MSP, Edinburgh North and Leith Constituency website
Minister quits for second time BBC Scotland profile

1949 births
Living people
Scottish Labour MPs
Labour MSPs
UK MPs 1992–1997
UK MPs 1997–2001
Scottish schoolteachers
People educated at George Watson's College
Alumni of the University of Edinburgh
Members of the Scottish Parliament 1999–2003
Members of the Scottish Parliament 2003–2007
Members of the Scottish Parliament 2007–2011
Members of the Scottish Parliament 2011–2016
Health ministers of Scotland
Members of the Scottish Parliament for Edinburgh constituencies
Members of the Parliament of the United Kingdom for Edinburgh constituencies